Florian Vogel may refer to:

 Florian Vogel (cyclist) (born 1982), Swiss racing cyclist
  (born 1974), German dramaturge and theatrical artistic director
 Florian Vogel (swimmer) (born 1994), German Olympic swimmer
 Florian Vogel (physicist) (born 1996), German physicist and chess player in Sweden